The JPL was a brass era cyclecar built in Detroit, Michigan by the J.P.L. Cyclecar Company in 1913.

History 
The JPL was designed by J.P. La Vigne who was an early and ubiquitous engineer in the industry. The car was marketed both as the JPL and La Vigne and in 1914 as a light car. The cyclecar was equipped with a   engine with a  transmission. Production ceased in 1914.

References

 

Cyclecars
Defunct motor vehicle manufacturers of the United States
Motor vehicle manufacturers based in Michigan
Cars introduced in 1913
Defunct manufacturing companies based in Detroit
Brass Era vehicles
1910s cars